Octopon is the second extended play by British rock band Dark Stares. The four track EP, self-produced by the band with John Mitchell and Ben Humphreys, was released with AWAL on 1 July 2013. All tracks from Octopon were released as singles with b-sides in chronological order, as well as music videos for both "Bad Machine" and "Shinigami".

In August 2013, Octopon was officially launched with MAMA at a headline show at the Barfly in Camden, London, with support from Alexis Kings.

In January 2014, opening track "Bad Machine" was aired live on The Dave Fanning Show on RTÉ 2fm. It was announced as U2 single "Invisible" as part of an admitted hoax by Fanning and Bono, after a three decade history of U2 single exclusives. Hot Press compared "Bad Machine" favorably: "[It] could have been U2 getting noisy and industrial again a la 'Elevation'"

Track listing

Personnel
Miles Kristian Howell – lead vocals, guitar
Taylor Howell – drums, percussion
 Harry Collins – lead guitar, backing vocals
 Brett Harland Howell – bass guitar, backing vocals

References

External links
 
Dark Stares official website

2013 EPs